Athairne Mac Eoghain, Irish poet, fl. 1200–1600.

Athairne Mac Eoghain was a poet who lived in Ireland in the medieval era. His exact lifetime is uncertain, and he appears to be known only from a single surviving poem attributed to him, Mairg dar compánach an cholann. His surname is now generally rendered McEoin, McKeown, or Owenson.

External links
 http://www.ucc.ie/celt/published/G402027/index.html
 http://www.irishtimes.com/ancestor/surname/index.cfm?fuseaction=Go.&UserID=

Medieval Irish poets
Year of death unknown
Year of birth unknown
Irish male poets
Irish-language writers